Bashore is a surname. Notable people with the surname include:

Juliet Bashore (born 1956), American filmmaker
Kayla Bashore (born 1983), American field hockey player
Lee T. Bashore (1898–1944), American politician
Walt Bashore (1909–1984), American athlete